Wavegarden SL is an engineering enterprise dedicated to the research, design, manufacture, installation, commissioning and promotion of wave generating systems and lagoons for surfing. The company's headquarters are in the Basque Country near San Sebastián, Northern Spain. The company employs over 60 full time staff with departments in mechanical, civil and electrical engineering, fluid dynamics, software development, water treatment, architecture, business development and operations. 

All technologies are developed in-house and the company holds a range of international patents. Today, 5 Wavegarden surf parks are in operation: Adventure Park Snowdonia, North Wales; The Wave Bristol, England; URBNSURF, an Australian Surf Business Magazine in Melbourne, Australia; Wavepark, Sihueng, South Korea; and Alaia Bay, Sion, Switzerland. Other Wavegarden surf parks are under construction in Brazil: Praia da Grama in San Paulo and Surfland in Garopaba. A further 30 projects are being developed in countries across 5 continents.

History
Wavegarden was founded in 2005 in San Sebastián, Spain by spouses Josema Odriozola (Engineer) and Karin Frisch (Sports Economist), both avid surfers, who aimed to reproduce an authentic surfing experience beyond the ocean. Their objective was to find a way to share surfing with more people around the world by fusing science and creativity. This eventually led to the creation of modern day surfing lagoons with unlimited ocean-like waves.

2005-2009 Research phase

Different artificial wave prototypes for surfing are explored, both circular and linear.

2010 First man-made waves are produced in Spain

The first surfable ocean-like wave is made. The system comprises a hydrodynamic wavefoil that moves at floor level that leads to the formation of a breaking wave. Bewildered by the unusual sight of waves breaking in a mountain backdrop a range of top professionals including former world champions Mick Fanning, Gabriel Medina, make folklore by surfing the artificial knee-high waves.

2012-13 Creation of Wavegarden Lagoon

Creation of the first bi-directional surfing lagoon with perfect left and right hand waves. The demo model measures 220 x 50m and has a bidirectional wavefoil. It creates 120 waves per hour that stand 1.20m (4.25ft) high and rides extend for 20 seconds long. Professional surfers Taj Burrow and Dane Reynolds validate the surfability of the waves.

2015 First Wavegarden Lagoon opens in the U.K

Opening of the world's first public Wavegarden surfing facility Surf Snowdonia in North Wales, U.K. Developed by Conwy Adventure Leisure Ltd. at a cost of £12 million. In the first 12 months, visitation reached 150,000 people, with 30,000 waves being created. The first international surf event in a wave pool, the Red Bull Unleashed, was staged and won by Hawaiian surfer Albee Layer. In 2019 Surf Snowdonia modified their trading name to Adventure Parc Snowdonia.

2016 Second Wavegarden Lagoon opens in USA

Opening of the second public surfing facility featuring a Wavegarden Lagoon in Austin, Texas.

2016-2017 Construction of First Wavegarden Cove demo model 

Construction of the first Wavegarden Cove demo facility, a new generation technology capable of making up to 1000 waves per hour. The modular electro mechanical system marks a departure from the wavefoil system and its limitations of wave frequency and variety. Wave settings are adjustable with the aid of a customized software program and a push button control panel. Offering an infinite variety of waves for all surfing levels, the highest user capacities and highest energy efficiency and an authentic surf experience, this patented technology is now referred to as the of best artificial wave technology in the world.

2019 42 module first full-size Wavegarden Cove opens in Bristol, England
The world’s first commercial Wavegarden Cove facility opened to the public: The Wave Bristol, England, UK.a £25 million project, based in Easter Compton.

2020 46 module Wavegarden Cove opens in Melbourne, Australia

URBNSURF Melbourne, Australia becomes the second Wavegarden Cove to open publicly. Located in Tullamarine, adjacent the Melbourne airport, the park spans 2.2 hectares, can generate up to 30 different wave types and has a surfer capacity of 84 surfers per hour. 1 The park adopted a utilitarian and sustainable design approach by using 18,000 ton of recycled concrete to form the base and walls of the lagoon, making it the largest recycled concrete structure in Australia. Melbourne-born Hollywood star Chris Hemsworth joined professional surfers Julian Wilson and Sally Fitzgibbons at the opening ceremony. Visitation for the first quarter of 2020 was recorded at 65,000 people.

56 module Wavegarden Cove opens in Siheung, South Korea

Wave Park is Asia’s biggest surf park and the centerpiece of a new luxury marine complex. Located just 30 min. from Seoul’s Int. Incheon Airport it’s the largest Wavegarden Cove built to date. Wave Park is located on a new 167,000 m2 waterfront development on Turtle Island. The first stage of the project was completed in just 18 months and provides aquatic activities like kayaking, SUP and swimming in zones with and without waves. Stage 2 of the development includes six hotels, convention centers, marinas and museums.

March 2021 Wavegarden arrives to the Swiss Alps 
On 1 May 2021, Alaia Bay opened in Sion, Switzerland. It is the first surf pool open to the public in mainland Europe.

July 2021 The first Wavegarden of Americas is set to open in Brazil 
The first surf park of Latin America located in the countryside 45 minutes from Sao Paulo.

Technology 
In 2010 Wavegarden established an R&D Center in the Basque Country, Spain and have maintained a strict approach to research ever since. Thanks to the full-size test facilities, Wavegarden’s engineers can thoroughly test technologies and products before they are brought to market. Computer simulations and scale model testing are performed prior to their transformation into full-size demo models. 

Wavegarden has developed two different technologies to produce perfect surfing waves beyond the ocean: Wavegarden Lagoon (not available anymore) and The Wavegarden Cove. The new Wavegarden Cove technology marks a departure from standard foil systems. The machinery is modular, eschewing complicated hydraulic or pneumatic systems in favor of a smart and robust electro mechanical system. Each module unit has several devices that work in sequence to push out water. As the wave travels down the wave pool modules activate to push the wave further down the line. 

A standard size facility like Urbnsurf Melbourne has 46 of these modules and offers rides up to 16 seconds long. Longer rides are possible in larger facilities. Consequently, very little energy is lost in the transmission of forces, which keeps running costs at a minimum and makes the Wavegarden Cove the most energy-efficient technology on the market today. The versatility of the technology allows to change wave height, shape and power in an instant to match the experience level of all surfers and allows to can adjust the number of waves to cater precisely for the number of surfers in the water. The size of a standard Wavegarden Cove facility measures 160x160m, although the footprint is fully customizable to all types of projects including stand-alone projects, mixed use schemes, surf resorts, private residential developments, hotels and commercial centers. 

To keep the water crystal clear and hygienically safe, each Wavegarden Cove is supplied with its own state-of-the-art water treatment system. Developed in-house, the system is based on a series of sustainable treatments including fine filtration, ozone & UV disinfection, and low chemical chlorination.

Wavegarden Cove facilities are fitted with the access points and amenities for handicapped. Community benefits include the creation of employment, increase in tourism and elevated value of neighboring real estate.

Wavegarden surf lagoons

 On August 1, 2015 the first Wavegarden lagoon, Surf Snowdonia in Dolgarrog, North Wales, opened to the public.

 NLand Surf Park in Austin, Texas featured their second commercial lagoon when it opened for business on 7 Oct 2016.  
 2019 The Wave in Bristol, the first Wavegarden Cove lagoon opens to public.  
 2020 URBNSURF becomes Australia's first surf park opens to public 
 2020 WAVE PARK, Asia’s biggest surf park is the centerpiece of a new luxury marine complex
 2021 Alaïa Bay is set to open, first Surf Park in Continental Europe. 
 2021 Praia da Grama, an inland tropical surf beach in Brazil. The first surf park in the world located inside a residential complex.

References

Engineering companies of Spain
Basque companies
Organisations based in San Sebastián
2005 establishments in the Basque Country (autonomous community)